is a Japanese phrase for books and magazines that are rented out.  refers to the book rental service it was based on, also just simply called .

 began in Japan around c. 1630 because books were too expensive for common people to buy, and therefore people would prefer borrowing over buying. Some "librarians" would travel around in order to increase their clientele and make more money.

The  market exploded after World War II all over Japan. People of both genders and all ages rented books, manga, and monthly magazines. However, when libraries were built nationwide and publishers started to print more copies of their books and magazines so they could be sold for lower prices in the mid-1950s, the number of  decreased dramatically. In modern Japan there are only a few  stores left, and the market is very small.

 is called  in Chinese. In Taiwan, it is a store that buys the books and rents them to customers to get the profit. Besides renting books, some stores help customers to order books and also provide VCDs or DVDs for renting.

See also

References

Book rental
Books by type
Japanese culture